Billy Vladimir Arce Mina (born 12 July 1998) is an Ecuadorian footballer who plays for Uruguayan club Peñarol. He can play either as a left winger or a forward.

Club career

Early career - Independiente del Valle
Born in Esmeraldas, Arce finished his formation with Independiente del Valle, after playing for Emelec, CSCD Fedeguayas and CSCD La Paz. He made his first-team debut for the former on 5 February 2017, starting and scoring the game's only through a penalty kick in a home defeat of Deportivo Cuenca.

On 25 November 2017, Arce scored a brace in a 4–1 home routing of Guayaquil City. He finished his first senior campaign with 12 goals in 39 appearances, being the club's second-best goalscorer behind Michael Estrada.

Brighton & Hove Albion

On 3 August 2018, Independiente del Valle confirmed Arce's transfer to Premier League side Brighton & Hove Albion. On 1 March 2022, Brighton & Hove Albion reached an agreement with Arce to terminate his contract.

Loans whilst at Brighton
On the same day for signing for the English club he penned a loan move to Segunda División club Extremadura UD. On the 8 January, after being rarely used, he returned to his home country after agreeing a loan move to Emelec. Arce signed for Barcelona SC of the Ecuadorian Serie A on loan, being his third loan signing whilst at the Sussex Club.

Personal life
In October 2019, Arce was jailed for twenty days having been arrested for drink-driving.

Career statistics

References

External links

1998 births
Living people
Sportspeople from Esmeraldas, Ecuador
Ecuadorian footballers
Association football wingers
Association football forwards
Ecuadorian Serie A players
Segunda División players
C.S.D. Independiente del Valle footballers
C.S. Emelec footballers
Brighton & Hove Albion F.C. players
Extremadura UD footballers
Barcelona S.C. footballers
L.D.U. Quito footballers
Ecuadorian expatriate footballers
Ecuadorian expatriate sportspeople in England
Ecuadorian expatriate sportspeople in Spain
Expatriate footballers in England
Expatriate footballers in Spain